Ložín is a village and municipality in Michalovce District in the Kosice Region of eastern Slovakia.

History
In historical records the village was first mentioned in 1227.

Geography
The village lies at an altitude of 118 metres and covers an area of  (2020-06-30/-07-01).

Population

Culture
The village has a public library and a football pitch.

Gallery

References

External links

https://web.archive.org/web/20070427022352/http://www.statistics.sk/mosmis/eng/run.html

Villages and municipalities in Michalovce District